KMVG (890 AM) is a radio station broadcasting a Roman Catholic religious radio format. Licensed to Gladstone, Missouri, KMVG serves the Kansas City metropolitan area.  The station is owned by Catholic Radio Network, Inc., which simulcasts KMVG on co-owned 1190 KEXS and its FM translator K225CI at 92.9 MHz.  The Catholic Radio Network also owns KDMR in Kansas City, which airs Spanish-language Catholic programming.

Because AM 890 is a clear-channel frequency reserved for Class A station WLS in Chicago, KMVG broadcasts only during the daytime hours, and must sign-off at sunset.

External links

MVG
Clay County, Missouri
Gospel radio stations in the United States
Radio stations established in 1997
1997 establishments in Missouri
MVG
MVG